Andy Skib (born November 9, 1985, San Diego, California) is the lead singer of the rock band Midwest Kings (MWK).  He spent most of 2009 on the Declaration Tour with American Idol season seven winner David Cook. Skib has previously co-written songs with former David Cook bandmate Neal Tiemann, who also served as lead guitarist for their band, Midwest Kings (MWK).  Additionally, he has co-written songs with artists Zac Maloy (The Nixons), Hanson, Graham Colton, and Jaret Reddick (Bowling for Soup).  Skib is also known for his most recent solo project, To Have Heroes. Skib is a member of David Cook's band, The Anthemic, providing rhythm guitar, keyboards and backup vocals. Skib and the rest of The Anthemic worked on Cook's second album for 19/RCA Records. The album, entitled This Loud Morning, was released on June 28, 2011.

Musical background
Skibb's musical influences are Sting and Jason Mraz.

Early career: 2002–2008
Midwest Kings
The Pearls
David Cook – Analog Heart
Bryan Jewett

2008–present
To Have Heroes
Midwest Kings
David Cook – David Cook
David Cook – This Loud Morning
David Cook - Digital Vein

Appearances

On tour
From January 18–25, 2009, Skib traveled with bandmates David Cook (born December 20, 1982) (guitar and lead vocals), Neal Tiemann (born December 22, 1982) (music director, lead guitar), Kyle Peek (born February 3, 1988) (drums, backing vocals), and Joey Clement (born May 21, 1981) (bass guitar) to the Middle East to complete a USO Tour. The band visited seven bases on their trip to Kuwait and Iraq and played songs from David Cook as well as crowd-pleasing covers including Tenacious D's Fuck Her Gently and Van Halen's Hot for Teacher.

In mid-February 2009, Skib embarked on a nationwide tour serving as rhythm guitarist and keyboardist in addition to singing backup vocals for The Declaration Tour to support the platinum-selling, major-label debut David Cook.  Skib has had the opportunity to perform lead vocals on "Make Me" and "'Til I'm Blue" (Midwest Kings songs) more than once during the run of the tour.  The tour began at Club Downunder in Tallahassee, Florida on February 13, 2009, and was originally set to end in Tulsa, Oklahoma on April 25, 2009. The tour was extended through the fall and came to a close on December 1, 2009, at The Fillmore in Charlotte, North Carolina after 154 shows.

In mid-May 2009, Skib and bandmates took a short break from the North American leg of the Declaration Tour to travel to Manila in the Philippines.  The band played a one night concert playing to upwards of 40,000 attendees at the SM Mall of Asia in Manila on May 16, 2009.

In mid-October 2011, Skib embarked on his second nationwide tour with David Cook, this time to support Cook's second album "This Loud Morning."  The tour, which was co-headlined by Gavin DeGraw, began on October 9, 2011, at Penn State University, and ended in Boone, North Carolina, at Appalachian State University on November 11, 2011.

Music videos

Discography

Songs written

Songs produced

Studio albums

Single(s)

References

External links
 MWK Official MySpace
 To Have Heroes Official MySpace
 Tour Dates (via Official David Cook website)
 Andy Skib's Twitter page.

1985 births
Living people
American alternative rock musicians
American rock musicians
American rock guitarists
American male guitarists
American rock songwriters
American rock singers
Musicians from San Diego
Musicians from Tulsa, Oklahoma
Alternative rock guitarists
Singer-songwriters from California
Singer-songwriters from Oklahoma
Guitarists from California
Guitarists from Oklahoma
21st-century American male singers
21st-century American singers
21st-century American guitarists
American male singer-songwriters